Comet Klinkerfues may refer to the following comets, all discovered by Ernst Friedrich Wilhelm Klinkerfues:
 C/1853 L1 (a.k.a. 1853 III)
 C/1854 L1 (a.k.a. 1854 III)
 C/1854 R1 (a.k.a. 1854 IV)
 C/1857 M1 (a.k.a. 1857 III)
 C/1857 Q1 (a.k.a. 1857 V)
 C/1863 G1 (a.k.a. 1863 II)